La Leona is a 1964 Argentine film directed by and starring Armando Bó with Isabel Sarli.

Cast
Isabel Sarli
Armando Bó
Santiago Gómez Cou
Mónica Grey
Monsueto
Arnaldo Montel
Gilberto Sierra
Adalberto Silva

References

External links

 

1964 films
1960s Spanish-language films
Argentine black-and-white films
Films directed by Armando Bó
1960s Argentine films